Wing is a subsidiary of Alphabet Inc. that develops a drone delivery system and UTM systems. The company completed their first deliveries in 2014. The company has operations in Australia, the United States, and Finland. In July 2018, Project Wing graduated from Google X to become an independent Alphabet company. As of January 2019, Wing began delivering take-out food and beverages out of its test facility in Bonython, Australia, as part of a pilot program. In April 2019 Wing became the first drone delivery company to receive an Air operator's certificate from the Federal Aviation Administration to allow it to operate as an airline in the USA. In the first quarter of 2022, the service made more than 50,000 deliveries.

Drone specification

Over the past six years, Wing developed its current aircraft to meet compliance standards and effectively deliver parcels through the air. The drones are specifically designed for small parcel delivery. Each aircraft features horizontally-oriented propellers like a classic multirotor drone, along with a fixed-wing to help it cover long distances quickly. The aircraft takes off vertically and then enters a forward-flight phase. Its motors are powered by electric batteries. For safety purposes, the aircraft features many redundant systems (extra propellers, batteries, etc.) so that if anything were to malfunction, flight can continue until a mechanic can address the issue. The flight path the aircraft follows is determined by Wing's UTM (Unmanned Traffic Management) System, which optimizes the route for time and distance efficiency while ensuring the plane's path will be obstacle-free. To assist in navigating unforeseen obstacles, the aircraft is equipped with black and white cameras that detect and analyze shapes without observing distinct features in order to preserve community privacy while maintaining safe flight. The company says that image data is not preserved, and is only used for ‘technical analysis’.

In 2022, the company introduced concepts for new models that could carry larger and smaller payloads.

Noise complaints
Wing's public operations have faced noise complaints. Residents in the rural southeastern region of Australia where Wing operates have complained about the disruption to their lives. A local dog club president stated the noise from the delivery drone trials spooks dogs when nearby. Some customers have opted-out of the trial citing this disruption. One ecologist states they worry these "drones are taking to the air without a lot of thought for the ears of people on the ground." In November 2019, the Australian Federal government found Wing's Canberra operation exceeded the residential noise standard. Wing has begun development of a noise-abatement propeller to address this issue.

References

External links 
 

X (company)
Alphabet Inc.
Alphabet Inc. subsidiaries
Unmanned aerial vehicle manufacturers
Technology companies established in 2002